The 2013-14 Yemeni League is the 22nd edition of top level football in Yemen.

The season started on December 20, 2013 and will finish in May 2014. The schedule has been brought forward again in time to finish prior to the 2014 FIFA World Cup.

Teams
Al-Tali'aa Taizz, Al-Wahda Aden, Al Wahda San'a' and Al-Shula were relegated to the second tier after finishing in the bottom four places of the 2013 Yemeni League season. They were replaced by May 22 Sana'a, Al-Ahli Taizz, Al Sha'ab Sana'a and Shabab al-Jeel.

Stadia and locations

Al Oruba appear to represent the small town of Zabid, but play all games in San'a'.

League standings

References 
RSSSF info page
http://www.futbol24.com/national/Yemen/Yemeni-League/2013-2014/

Yemeni League seasons
Yem
1